Hexes For Exes is a 2007 album by Moving Units, their third release. Rough demos of the tracks "Paper Hearts", "Dark Walls", and "Pick Up the Phone" were available on the band's Myspace as early as 2006. The album involves more electronica than their previous releases, with many tracks utilizing programmed beats and synthesizers.

Track listing

"Pink Thoughts" - 4:21
"Crash 'n' Burn Victims" - 3:30
"Paper Hearts" - 3:22
"The Kids from Orange County" - 4:07
"Dark Walls" - 4:02
"Pick Up the Phone" - 2:54
"Nail It to the Cross" - 3:42
"Wrong Again" - 3:11
"Kings and Queens of Nothing" - 4:19
"Hearts Departed" - 3:31
"Blood Beats" - 3:34

References

External links
Site @ Metropolis Records

Moving Units albums
2007 albums